Gałkowice-Ocin  is a village in the administrative district of Gmina Wilczyce, within Sandomierz County, Świętokrzyskie Voivodeship, in south-central Poland.

The village has a population of 230.

References

Villages in Sandomierz County